The Pittsburgh Jewish Chronicle is an American weekly newspaper published every Thursday for the Jewish community in the Greater Pittsburgh Region. The newspaper is owned and distributed by the Pittsburgh Jewish Publication and Education Foundation.

History 
The founding executive editor of the Jewish Chronicle in 1962 was Albert W. Bloom, then a reporter and science editor of the Pittsburgh Post-Gazette. Bloom wrote the editorials and a weekly column "People and Issues" for over 20 years. Under Bloom's leadership, the paper became one of the leading Jewish papers in the US, and ran a number of prize winning series. Bloom continued as editor until his retirement in 1983, when he also served as president of the American Jewish Press Association. Joel Roteman succeeded Bloom and edited the paper from 1983.

Content and audience 
Because Pittsburgh has a relatively large population of Jews, especially in Squirrel Hill, the publication has a higher circulation than most other local Jewish newspapers. The Chronicle reports on news occurring in the local Jewish community and city as a whole as well as national and global news that is of Jewish interest, especially news related to Israel. It also extensively covers Jewish news in West Virginia, and is believed to be the only Jewish publication to pay consistent attention to Jewish activities in that state. The newspaper has a religious column called the Portion of the Week, usually written by a local rabbi or religious leader. Other features include advertisements, letters to the editors, and a calendar of upcoming community events.

See also 
History of the Jews in Pittsburgh
List of Jewish newspapers
Media in Pittsburgh

References

External links

Jewish newspapers published in the United States
Chronicle
Jewish Chronicle